The 27 Club graffiti is a mural in Tel Aviv, Israel, painted by John Kiss, with the assistance of Itai Froumin and Roman Kozhokin. The work depicts, from left to right, Brian Jones, Jimi Hendrix, Janis Joplin, Jim Morrison, Jean-Michel Basquiat, Kurt Cobain, Amy Winehouse and an unknown figure believed to depict Kiss.

Background 

The work was created by John Kiss, an Israeli street artist and peace activist. Known previously as Jonathan Kis-Lev, His graffiti work, political installations, community-based projects and public artworks have granted him the title the “Israeli Banksy.”

Development 
Kiss enjoyed creating large murals corresponding with the art of graffiti, and drawing references to tales and legends. However, he also wished to discuss deeper messages in his work, and to lead viewers to existential contemplation and even cathartic experiences. One such existential contemplation which highly engrossed Kiss in his twenties came as a result of his commercial success as an artist. Beginning to sell his art in galleries around the world, he was often uncomfortable with his success, the perception of his success, and the "price of fame." The more well known Kiss had become in the art world, the more he found the attention addictive: "It was easy to indulge in the attention, in the admiration and the external validation. Yet it left me altogether more lonely," and was followed by "emptiness."

Kiss became obsessed with what he called "the price of fame," being the success of people won public acclaim at an early age. He was intrigued by artists who died early after achieving great fame, and, in particular, he was drawn to the life of Jean-Michel Basquiat. Basquiat, a contemporary of Andy Warhol, was famous by age twenty, selling his street-art paintings in auctions for great sums. Basquiat's success came, however, at a price. He died at age 27 of a heroin overdose.

Kiss became obsessed with Basquiat beginning in his early twenties. Since Basquiat was a graffiti artist, and since Kiss as well was a graffiti artist, and since both of them won relative success in their early twenties, Kiss felt that Basquiat's death at age 27 was an ominous, foreboding warning.

Kiss was 26 years old when English singer Amy Winehouse died. She, like Basquiat, also died at the age of 27. The approaching 27th birthday for Kiss the following year felt "seriously threatening" for the artist.

Veering away from the whimsicality of some of his previous work, Kiss began researching other well-known artists who died at that age, and to find the causes for their death, hoping to somehow learn how to save himself from that fate. The list was exhaustingly long, comprising the infamous "27 Club". Kiss began sketching portraits of artists who died at that age: Jimi Hendrix, Janis Joplin, Jim Morrison, Kurt Cobain, Amy Winehouse, and Jean-Michel Basquiat, among others. The theme soon began occupying Kiss' time to an extent verging on obsession.

Constantly preoccupied with the 27 Club, Kiss decided to paint a large scale mural showing portraits of key figures who died at 27. Remarkably, he also decided to include a portrait of himself in the mural, with the intention of erasing his own portrait when—and if—he would turn 28. "Erasing myself was to be my victory of survival," he explained.

Kiss planned the mural for months as he wished to execute it "perfectly." He painted sketches repeatedly, never truly becoming ready to paint the mural. He later said, "I think it was a delay mechanism, a way to protect myself. I was not ready." It was only after Kiss turned 28 that he set to finally create the mural.

While the subject matter of the mural could be depressing—the early death of highly talented individuals—Kiss wished to portray an "uplifting" portrait of theses individuals and their lives. "I wanted to do something that would celebrate their creative life rather than lament their early death. For that I needed colors." Kiss decided to give each character three unique colors: first a light background, then a darker color for the shades, and finally a dark color for the eyes, nostrils and tiny facial features. Each figure was to have its own set of colors, and the colors for all the figures had to "harmonize together to a complete piece." As to the figures' expression, Kiss wished to depict each figure directly facing the viewer, staring into the viewer with a blank, powerful stare.Kiss chose a prominent wall in the heart of Tel Aviv, on Haim Ben Atar Street. Unlike previous pieces Kiss created, he knew this piece, due to its size and intricate usage of colors and layers, could not be completed quickly, and that the police was bound to come and arrest him. Apart from heavy fines, the penalty in Israel for anyone who paints, writes, engraves or draws on private walls is up to a one-year prison sentence.

To avoid getting arrested Kiss created an elaborate cover story to explain to police officers that the work was "commissioned" by the Tel Aviv city hall's public art department. Kiss chose the holiday of Rosh Hashana, when city hall workers were in their annual vacation, as the time to execute the work and ensure that the police would be unable to reach the public art department in the city hall. To convince police that the large work was indeed commissioned, he made himself and the team wear yellow vests and yellow helmets like city hall workers. He also rented a private crane and prepared special signs to be pasted on the crane stating: "Property of the Tel Aviv Municipality."

Art journalist Zipa Kampinski of Israel's largest newspaper, Yedioth Ahronoth, was privy to the story and covered the mural's secretive creation process.

Kiss was assisted by fellow artists Itai Froumin and Roman Kozhokin to execute the piece. The police came immediately after work began on the large wall. Kiss argued convincingly, and the work was not stopped nor was the team arrested although the police arrived several times to the scene. The work took 24 hours for the team to complete. The large painting attracted an enthusiastic audience to the spot where the graffiti was created which confused the police officers.

Like in previous works, Kiss included his signature drips at the bottom of the mural. He painted the portraits of the famous artists in colors, but left his own portrait at the far right in gray.

The work depicts, from left to right: Brian Jones, Jimi Hendrix, Janis Joplin, Jim Morrison, Jean-Michel Basquiat, Kurt Cobain, Amy Winehouse and the figure of the artist. Soon after the completion of the work, Kiss' portrait was vandalized with pink paint thrown at it. Kiss did not supply the press with details about his own figure, which was left for many to guess, believing the figure "to be the artist".

Reception 

In an article in The Mediterranean Observer, it was stated that:Located at Haim Ben-Atar Street in Tel Aviv, local artist John Kiss shows the most popular members from the fictitious “27 Club.” The piece depicts Jimi Hendrix, Janis Joplin, Jim Morrison, Brian Jones, Jean-Michel Basquiat, Kurt Cobain, Amy Winehouse; all of whom died tragically at the age of 27. To the far right, there is an 8th unknown man believed to be the artist himself. As the story goes at the time, Kiss was dealing with drug and alcohol addiction, including himself in this piece was seen as some sort of self-fulfilling prophecy in his own eyes. One day, someone painted over his face, causing many to speculate on the art work’s new meaning. Some say that the artists’ enemies covered his face in an act of pettiness; others noted that either the artist or his sister came to cover his face after he successfully lived to 28, beating his own prophecy.Kiss' portrait was covered by pink paint, and "there is some argument as to whether or not the pink paint over Kiss’s face was done by Kiss himself or another artist. One rumor is that Kiss was so disappointed in all that he hadn’t accomplished by the age of 27, that he included paint to cover his face." Another was that he was proud he had made it to age 28, which was why he included his face, and then erased it himself.

The artist received "much criticism" for including his own portrait among the 27 club members. The criticism focused on adding his portrait alongside great artists who have not crossed the age of 27. According to this view, if indeed it was not Kiss himself who mysteriously covered his face, the covering of his face by an anonymous vandal was therefor "just." Some interpret the work as depressing, and see a morbid quality to it. Others note the "pain which follows the disappearance of the sudden gratification of fame and the dangerous emptiness that follows."

Over the years since its creation in 2014 the work has become known as one of Israel's must-see street artworks, and according to From the Grapevine Magazine "the most popular in Florentin." Some locals define it as "sensational," and as their superior version of a local "museum," demanding the municipality to "preserve it."

The work was featured in the Israeli street art documentary The Streets Are Ours ("HaRehovot Hem Shelanu"). It also appeared in books, magazines, newspapers, online journals, and praised as being an incident in which the "greatest art is actually on the street," and in which "graffiti manages to be graffiti, in the good sense of the word."

Outside of Israel, the work became a symbol of the 27 club. It was featured in universities, news sites,  travel magazines, as well as was being parodied often. It appeared in articles in Polish, Italian, Spanish, French, Indonesian, Russian, and others.

Prints of it appeared in international museum exhibits. It is considered one of the top graffiti works in Israel.

As of April 2021, the work is still visible and remains intact. The spot where it was painted had become a meeting point for tours to convene in, and the wall right underneath it is today filled with dozens of graffiti works by multiple artists from around the world. It became a symbol of the gentrification process in South Tel Aviv, as well as an icon of the city. Time Out Magazine cited this work among "The most beautiful in Tel Aviv."

See also 
 Banksy 
 Street art
 List of street artists

External links 
 "6 Incredible Street Art Pieces in Tel Aviv, Israel". The Mediterranean Observer. 1 May 2021. 
Peterson, Sydney. "12 Must-See Works Of Israeli Street Art". The Forward, 8 March 2017.
27 Club Graffiti Explained (video in Hebrew), Zahi Shaked,

References 

Graffiti and unauthorised signage
Culture in Tel Aviv
2014 paintings
Cultural aspects of death
Amy Winehouse
Cultural depictions of Janis Joplin
Cultural depictions of Jimi Hendrix
Cultural depictions of Kurt Cobain